Silver Lake is a reservoir in the Sierra Nevada mountains of California.

It is located within Amador County. It is surrounded by Eldorado National Forest and is part of the El Dorado Irrigation District (EID) and their Hydroelectric Project 184 system. Snow and ice are common in this area during winter seasons.

It used to be reachable between 1848 and 1863 by taking Old Emigrant Road, now you can access it off of California Highway 88 or known locally as the "Carson Pass Highway".

In the center of the lake is Treasure Island which is only accessible by boat or swimming.

Silver Lake West Recreation Area/Campground 
Silver lake is home to Silver Lake West Campground

This is a first-come-first-served campground with 42 campsites. The campground is open from May until October, weather permitting. All campsites contain one to two vehicle parking, fire rings with grill, bear-resistant food storage lockers, and picnic tables.  Some can accommodate small RVs and motor homes. There is no cell coverage at this campground.

Swimming, fishing and recreational boating are available at the lake.  There is a small fee to launch boats at the improved ramp. Some watercraft are usually available for rent at the Kit Carson Lodge located at the North end of the lake. The lodge also offers many other individual or group activities such as gold rush tours and horseback riding.

Silver Lake Hikes 
There are many trials located near and around Silver Lake, such as

 Shealor Lake trailhead
 Granite Lake trail
 LakeMargaret trailhead
 Thunder Mountain trailhead
 Meiss Lake trailhead
 Frog Lake trailhead

Wildlife & Fishing 
Silver Lake is open year-round for fishing with a 5 trout daily take limit and a 10 in possession bag limit It has been periodically stocked with fish by the California Department of Fish and Wildlife (CDFW) since 1930. Currently there are Rainbow Trout (Oncorhynchus mykiss), 

Local animals including deer, bears, birds, squirrels and other rodents, insects, and mountain lions are found along the hiking trails, rim of the lake, and in the various camp grounds.

See also 
Caples Lake
South Lake Tahoe

References 

Reservoirs in Amador County, California